This is a list of indoor arenas in Europe by capacity. A broad definition of "Europe" is used here, including the entirety of Russia, Turkey, Israel, Armenia, Azerbaijan, Georgia and Kazakhstan.

The venues are by their final capacity after construction for seating-only events. There is more capacity if standing room is included (i.e. for concerts). All venues with at least 10,000 seats are listed.

Current arenas

Current arenas that can be used for football

Currently these arenas are primarily used for indoor sports and/or other events i.e. music concerts, but can also receive association football or rugby matches in the winter, unlike the US and Canada domes, which are enclosed stadiums primarily used for outdoor sports.

Telenor Arena could be considered the only dome in Europe from its opening in 2009 until 2011, when the association football club Stabæk used it for their home matches before returning to their old home, Nadderud Stadion, as the club couldn't support the rent to play at Telenor Arena. The next domed stadium to open in Europe was Paris La Défense Arena in 2017.

Arenas under construction

Proposed arenas

See also 
List of indoor arenas by capacity 
List of association football stadiums by capacity
List of European stadiums by capacity

References

Europe
Europe
Europe-related lists